Statistics of Austrian first league in the 1927–28 season.

Overview
It was contested by 13 teams, and SK Admira Wien won the championship.

League standings

Results

References

Austrian Football Bundesliga seasons
Austria
1927–28 in Austrian football